The 1963 Ice Hockey World Championships was the 30th edition of the Ice Hockey World Championships. The tournament was held in Stockholm, Sweden from March 7 to March 17, 1963. The Soviet Union won the tournament for the third time, starting their roll of nine straight championships.  For the Soviets it was also their seventh European title.  

A new tie-breaking method was introduced and was effective for this World Championship only: Any tie on points for a medal place would be decided according to goal differential involving only the top five placed nations. If a tie for a medal place continued among only two teams, the second step was to award the superior medal to the winner of the game played between the two.  The purpose of the change was to lessen the incentive for top teams to run up the score on weaker teams. This formula was immediately called upon to decide the medals and greatly magnified the drama on the final day, as the Soviets won the gold by a one-goal margin (+8 to +7), rather than a seven-goal margin (+41 to +34) under the previous system.   

Heading into the last day, the Swedes were two points ahead of the Soviets, having defeated them 2-1; Sweden was +8 on the first tiebreaker while the Soviets were +6. The first game of the day was East Germany vs U.S.A., seemingly a game of small significance—but an American win would propel them into fifth place, displacing Finland, and would give Sweden +19 on the first tiebreaker (due to Sweden's 17-2 win over the Americans) while the Soviets would have +10. An American shot hit the East German crossbar with three seconds left in the game, and it ended 3-3. The four-way tie for fifth place was resolved according to goal difference among all teams in the group. Sweden's edge on the first tiebreaker remained +8 to +6. 

Next up was Sweden vs. Czechoslovakia. The Swedes needed a single point to clinch the gold, but Czechoslovakia won 3-2 to clinch the bronze. The last game of the tournament between the Soviet Union and Canada would then decide gold and silver, with the loser of the game placing fourth. Sweden's tiebreaker edge over the Soviets was now +7 to +6. The Soviets needed to win by more than one goal to take the gold. A one-goal margin would clinch the gold for Sweden, winners of the head-to-head game. Canada needed a win to take the silver. In the end, everything went the Soviets' way on the final day, as they prevailed 4-2 on Sweden's home ice.

A record twenty-one nations participated, at three levels, with most nations returning to the group where they played in 1961.  This meant that the unfortunate Norwegians, despite defeating and placing higher than West Germany in 1962, returned to the 'B' pool.  Even in the neutral site of Sweden, there was still a political incident.  Unlike in 1961, the two German nations ended up playing their game against each other, with the West winning.  Following the game when the winners flag was raised, the East Germans refused to acknowledge it, and were suspended for three months following their final game.

The North American entries were historically poor.  The Trail Smoke Eaters, representing Canada, finished out of the medals for the first time.  It would be the last time that an Allan Cup champion would be selected to represent Canada.  The Americans lost to everyone except the two German teams, finishing last.

World Championship Group A (Sweden)

Final Round

World Championship Group B (Sweden)

Final Round

World Championship Group C (Sweden)

Final Round

Ranking and statistics

Tournament awards
Best players selected by the directorate:
Best Goaltender:       Seth Martin
Best Defenceman:       Roland Stoltz
Best Forward:          Miroslav Vlach
Media All-Star Team:
Goaltender:  Kjell Svensson
Defence:  Alexander Ragulin,  Harry Smith
Forwards:  Hans Mild,  Addie Tambellini,  Miroslav Vlach

Final standings
The final standings of the tournament according to IIHF:

European championships final standings
The final standings of the European championships according to IIHF:

Citations

References
Championnat du monde 1963

 

IIHF Men's World Ice Hockey Championships
World Championships
1963
1963 in Swedish sport
March 1963 sports events in Europe
International sports competitions in Stockholm
1960s in Stockholm
Cham